Michael Lee Davis (born October 7, 1992) is an American professional mixed martial artist competing in the Lightweight division of the Ultimate Fighting Championship (UFC).

Background
Davis was born in Hudson, New York and grew up in South Cairo, New York. Davis graduated from Cairo-Durham High School, where he also started wrestling. After the high school, Davis graduated from Columbia–Greene Community College with an associate degree in exercise physiology.

Mixed martial arts career

Early career
After his amateur career, Davis turned professional in 2015. He racked up a record of 5–0 before he was invited to participate Dana White's Contender Series. He faced Sodiq Yusuff at Dana White's Contender Series 14 on July 24, 2018. He lost the fight via unanimous decision.

After the Contender Series, Davis continued in Island Fights. He faced Elvin Brito for the Island Fights Lightweight Championship at Island Fights 51 on December 21, 2018. He won the fight and the championship via third-round knockout. He won another fight against Carlos Guerra before being called to replace the injured Eric Wisely on short notice at UFC Fight Night: Jacaré vs. Hermansson.

Ultimate Fighting Championship
In his promotional debut, Davis faced Gilbert Burns at UFC Fight Night: Jacaré vs. Hermansson on April 27, 2019, losing the bout via second-round submission.

Davis was expected to make his sophomore appearance against Danny Henry at UFC Fight Night: Hermansson vs. Cannonier on September 28, 2019. However, Henry withdrew from the fight and Davis was subsequently booked to replace Brok Weaver and face Thomas Gifford at UFC Fight Night: Joanna vs. Waterson on October 12, 2019. He won the fight via third-round knockout.

Davis was then scheduled to face Giga Chikadze at UFC Fight Night: Benavidez vs. Figueiredo on February 29, 2020. However, Davis pulled out due to an injury. The bout was rebooked to take place at UFC on ESPN: Overeem vs. Harris on May 16, 2020, only to see Davis withdraw again due to a weight cut related illness and be replaced by Irwin Rivera.

Davis faced UFC newcomer Mason Jones at UFC on ESPN: Magny vs. Chiesa on January 20, 2021. He won the close fight via unanimous decision. He earned a Fight of the Night bonus for his performance.

Davis was scheduled to face Jai Herbert for the first time on March 19, 2022, at UFC Fight Night 204. However, Davis withdrew from the bout due to personal reasons and was replaced by Ilia Topuria.

Davis was scheduled to face Uroš Medić on October 1, 2022, at UFC Fight Night 211. However, Medić was removed from the bout for undisclosed reasons and he was replaced by Viacheslav Borshchev. Davis won the bout via unanimous decision.

Boxing career
Davis is also a professional boxer, holding a record of 3–0 with two knockouts.

Championships and accomplishments
Island Fights
Island Fights Lightweight Champion (one time; former)
 Ultimate Fighting Championship
 Fight of the Night (One time) 
MMAjunkie.com
2021 January Fight of the Month vs. Mason Jones

Mixed martial arts record

|-
|Win
| align=center|10–2
|Viacheslav Borshchev
|Decision (unanimous)
|UFC Fight Night: Dern vs. Yan
|
|align=center|3
|align=center|5:00
|Las Vegas, Nevada, United States
|
|-
| Win
| align=center|9–2
| Mason Jones
| Decision (unanimous)
| UFC on ESPN: Chiesa vs. Magny
| 
| align=center|3
| align=center|5:00
| Abu Dhabi, United Arab Emirates
|
|-
| Win
| align=center|8–2
| Thomas Gifford
| KO (punch)
| UFC Fight Night: Joanna vs. Waterson
| 
| align=center|3
| align=center|4:45
| Tampa, Florida, United States
| 
|-
| Loss
| align=center|7–2
| Gilbert Burns
| Submission (rear-naked choke)
| UFC Fight Night: Jacaré vs. Hermansson
| 
| align=center|2
| align=center|4:15
| Sunrise, Florida, United States
| 
|-
| Win
| align=center|7–1
| Carlos Guerra
| Submission (kimura)
| Island Fights 54
| 
| align=center|1
| align=center|2:08
| Panama City Beach, Florida, United States
| 
|-
| Win
| align=center|6–1
| Elvin Leon Brito
| TKO (punches)
| Island Fights 51
| 
| align=center|3
| align=center|2:52
| Pensacola, Florida, United States
| 
|-
| Loss
| align=center|5–1
| Sodiq Yusuff
| Decision (unanimous)
| Dana White's Contender Series 14
| 
| align=center|3
| align=center|5:00
| Las Vegas, Nevada, United States
|
|-
|Win
|align=center| 5–0
|Montrell James
|TKO (punches)
|Island Fights 46
|
|align=center| 1
|align=center| 2:22
|Pensacola, Florida, United States
|
|-
|Win
|align=center| 4–0
|Anthony Retic
|TKO (punches)
|Island Fights 42
|
|align=center| 2
|align=center| 2:35
|Pensacola, Florida, United States
|
|-
|Win
|align=center| 3–0
|Channin Williams
|KO (punches)
|Island Fights 41
|
|align=center| 1
|align=center| 3:29
|Pensacola, Florida, United States
|
|-
|Win
|align=center| 2–0
|Erimus Mills
|TKO
|House of Fame 4: Florida vs. Georgia
|
|align=center| 1
|align=center| 1:19
|Jacksonville, Florida, United States
|
|-
|Win
|align=center| 1–0
|Richard Dehnz
|TKO (punches)
|House of Fame 3: Riverside Beatdown
|
|align=center| 3
|align=center| 0:49
|Jacksonville, Florida, United States
|
|-

Professional boxing record

See also
 List of current UFC fighters
 List of male mixed martial artists

References

External links

1992 births
Living people
American male mixed martial artists
Featherweight mixed martial artists
Mixed martial artists utilizing boxing
Mixed martial artists utilizing wrestling
Ultimate Fighting Championship male fighters
American male boxers
Boxers from New York (state)